Benjamin Bailly (born 22 May 1990 in Liège) is a professional racing driver from Belgium.

Career

Karting
Bailly began his karting career in 2004, and three years later finished third in the French Elite Championship. Also in 2007, he achieved the highlight of his karting career, finishing fifth in the premier Formula A World Championship.

Formula Renault
In 2008, Bailly moved up to single-seater racing, joining the Formula Renault 2.0 WEC series for the first two races at Nogaro.

In 2009, he joined the Formul'Academy Euro Series which he won comfortably at the first attempt, taking eleven podium places from thirteen races in the process.

FIA Formula Two Championship
2010 saw Bailly move to the FIA Formula Two Championship. He finished the season in 7th position after winning the second of his two home races at Zolder.

Racing record

Career summary

Complete FIA Formula Two Championship results
(key) (Races in bold indicate pole position) (Races in italics indicate fastest lap)

References

External links
 Official website
 Career details from Driver Database
 

1990 births
Living people
Sportspeople from Liège
Belgian racing drivers
Formula Renault 2.0 WEC drivers
French F4 Championship drivers
ADAC Formula 4 drivers
FIA Formula Two Championship drivers
Formula Renault 2.0 Alps drivers
Formula Renault Eurocup drivers
Blancpain Endurance Series drivers
24 Hours of Spa drivers
Auto Sport Academy drivers
Karting World Championship drivers
RC Formula drivers
21st-century Belgian people
Danish F4 Championship drivers
Boutsen Ginion Racing drivers
24H Series drivers